Fenwick is a community in the Canadian province of Nova Scotia, located in  Cumberland County.

References
 Fenwick on Destination Nova Scotia

Communities in Cumberland County, Nova Scotia
General Service Areas in Nova Scotia